Eisenlohr–Bayuk Tobacco Historic District is a historic tobacco warehouse complex and national historic district located at Lancaster, Lancaster County, Pennsylvania. It includes 10 contributing buildings and 1 contributing structure.  The buildings consist of five constructed by the Otto Eisenlohr and Brothers between 1911 and 1921, four constructed by the Bayuk Cigar Co. between 1923 and about 1935, and the Jacob Reist Tobacco Warehouse built in 1923.  The contributing structure is an approximately 50 foot tall smokestack built in 1923.  All buildings are rectangular brick buildings used for the processing and storage of cigar leaf tobacco.

It was listed on the National Register of Historic Places in 1990.

References

Industrial buildings and structures on the National Register of Historic Places in Pennsylvania
Historic districts on the National Register of Historic Places in Pennsylvania
Buildings and structures in Lancaster, Pennsylvania
Historic districts in Lancaster County, Pennsylvania
Tobacco buildings in the United States
National Register of Historic Places in Lancaster, Pennsylvania